Thalía's Hits Remixed is a remix album by Latin pop singer Thalía released on 25 February 2003 in North America. It contains remixes of many of her hits, such as "Amor a la Mexicana", "Piel Morena", "No Me Enseñaste" and "Tú y Yo." It also contains the English version of "Arrasando", called "It's My Party" that was released only on CD single back in 2001 and the previously unreleased medley that Thalía recorded especially for her the 2001 Latin Grammy Awards performance. It was certified Platinum by the Recording Industry Association of America. In the Japanese version, the remix of "The Mexican (Dance Dance)"' used was the "Hex Hector-Mac Qualye Radio Remix".

Background and production
Since her first studio album on the EMI label Thalía's albums were released with added remixes of some songs as bonus tracks. In 1997, after the success of the album En éxtasis EMI released an EP entitled Bailando en Éxtasis which included remixes of the album, but none of the remixes from the EP were included in Thalía's Hits Remixed, instead the Hitmakers Version of "Piel Morena" that was added, that version appeared in the album Por Amor (French version of the album Amor a la Mexicana) and was used to promote the album in Brazil. From the next Thalía's album Amor a la Mexicana, "Mujer Latina" (Remix "España"), "Por Amor" (Primera Vez Remix) and "Amor a la Mexicana" (Cuca's Fiesta Mix) were added, the latter was the version released as a single in France in 1997 and has a different music video, the single of the song was certified gold there and in the same year others two remixes of "Amor a la Mexicana" were added as bonus tracks in international editions in some countries. Representing the Arrasando album are the remix of "Entre el Mar y una Estrella" (Pablo Flores Club Mix), the English version of "Arrasando" and a medley of the songs "Entre el Mar y una Estrella" and "Arrasando" that would be used in a performance at the 2001 Latin Grammy which was canceled due to the September 11 attacks. From Thalía's 2002 self-titled album was included the remixes "A Quién le Importa" (Hex Hector / Mac Quayle Club Mix), "Tú y Yo" (Ballad Version), "No me Enseñaste" (Estéfano Remix) and "The Mexican (Dance Dance) "(Hex Hector / Mac Quayle Club Mix).

Critical reception

The album was praised by th critics. Ron Slomowicz from Allabout.com website gave the album a favorable review and stated that while he "don't speak a word of Spanish" he "can feel the emotion through the chord changes, tempo transitions, and Thalia's heartfelt vocal interpretations". Michael Paoletta gave the album a favorable review in which he wrote that "Remix package can be hit or miss" and that Thalía's Hits Remixed "fall in to the former category". He also picked "Amor a la Mexicana" (Cuca's Fiesta Mix)  as the "absolute highlight of the set". Jason Birchmeier gave the album three out of four stars in a mixed review in which he wrote that the album is "for fanatics only" and one of Thalía's "least listenable albums" even though it "served as a good stopgap release in 2003" after Thalía "having released her smash self-titled album".

Track listing
 "A Quién le Importa" (Hex Hector/Mac Quayle Club Mix) – 7:12
 "It's My Party" (Arrasando English Version) – 3:56
 "Amor a la Mexicana" (Cuca's Fiesta Mix) – 6:49
 "Piel Morena" (Hitmakers Remix) – 5:12
 "Mujer Latina" (Remix "España") – 3:52
 "The Mexican (Dance Dance)" (Hex Hector/Mac Quayle Club Mix) – 8:46
 "No me Enseñaste" (Estéfano Remix) – 4:18
 "Entre el Mar y una Estrella" (Pablo Flores Club Mix) – 10:50
 "Por Amor" (Primera Vez Remix) – 4:39
 "Tú y Yo" (Ballad Version) – 3:28
 "Entre el Mar y una Estrella/Arrasando" (Medley) – 6:37
 "A Quién le Importa" (Bonus Enhanced Video)

Charts

Weekly charts

Year-end charts

Certifications and sales

References

External links 
iTunes Store
Amazon.com

Thalía remix albums
2003 remix albums
EMI Records remix albums